Tsak Rural LLG is a local-level government (LLG) of Enga Province, Papua New Guinea.

Wards
01. Pipites
02. Sapos
03. Komanda
04. Yogos
05. Tangaimanda
06. Kiangapu
07. Pumakos
08. Raiakam
09. Alumanda
10. Poketamanda
11. Ipali
12. Imangapos
13. Sapundis
14. Pitipais
15. Wanimas
16. Londol
17. Kwia

References

Local-level governments of Enga Province